What Is Love For is the first solo album by singer/songwriter Justin Currie, best known for his involvement in the band Del Amitri.

Track listing
All songs written by Justin Currie.
"What Is Love For?" – 3:10
"Not So Sentimental Now" – 2:57
"Walking Through You" – 3:26
"Something in That Mess" – 3:06
"If I Ever Loved You" – 4:30
"Only Love" – 3:15
"Gold Dust" – 3:17
"Out of My Control" – 3:42
"Where Did I Go?" – 3:48
"Still in Love" – 3:58
"No, Surrender" – 7:40
"In the Rain" (hidden track) – 1:31

Personnel
Jim McDermott – drums, percussion
Iain Harvie – acoustic guitar, pedal steel
Mark Price – drums
Andy Alston – organ
Chris Cruikshank – saxophone
Mick Slaven – guitar
Nick Clark – bass
Garry John Kane – bass
Ross McFarlane – drums
Andy May – organ, clavinet
Stuart Nisbet – guitar
Catriona McKay – harp
Fergus Kerr – French horn

References 

2007 debut albums
Justin Currie albums
Rykodisc albums